Rita Sahatçiu Ora (born Rita Sahatçiu on 26 November 1990) is a British singer and songwriter. She rose to prominence in February 2012 when she featured on DJ Fresh's single, "Hot Right Now", which reached number one in the UK. Her debut studio album, Ora, released in August 2012, debuted at number one in the United Kingdom. The album contained the UK number-one singles, "R.I.P." and "How We Do (Party)". Ora was the artist with the most number-one singles on the UK Singles Chart in 2012, with three singles reaching the top position.

Born in Pristina, modern-day Kosovo, Ora was named an Honorary Ambassador of Kosovo in 2015. Ora's second studio album, Phoenix, was released in November 2018. The lead single, "Your Song", reached the UK top ten, and the subsequent singles, "Anywhere" and "Let You Love Me", reached the top five in the UK. "Let You Love Me" made Ora the first British female solo artist to have thirteen top ten songs in the United Kingdom.

Early life 

Ora was born on 26 November 1990 in Pristina, SFR Yugoslavia (modern-day Kosovo), to Albanian parents. Her mother, Vera, is a psychiatrist and her father, Besnik Sahatçiu, is a pub owner, having previously studied economics. Ora has an older sister, Elena, and a younger brother, Don. She was born as Rita Sahatçiu (surname derived from the Turkish word , which means 'watchmaker'), but her parents later added Ora ( means 'time' in Albanian) to the family surname so it could be easily pronounced.

Her family left Kosovo for political reasons, because of the persecution of Albanians initiated with the disintegration of Yugoslavia. They relocated to London, England in 1991, when she was a baby. She grew up in Notting Hill, in West London, and attended a performing arts school, Sylvia Young Theatre School.

Music career

2008–2011: Career beginnings  

Ora began performing at open mic sessions around London and, occasionally, in her father's pub. In 2008, she auditioned for Eurovision: Your Country Needs You on BBC One to be the British contestant for the Eurovision Song Contest 2009 and qualified, but later withdrew from the competition after a few episodes as she "did not feel ready" and thought "that challenge wasn't for her." Her manager, Sarah Stennett (who also worked with Ellie Goulding, Jessie J and Conor Maynard), later told HitQuarters that she  reassured Ora that performing in Eurovision would hinder, rather than help her chances to make it as a solo artist.

Shortly after, Ora's management got in touch with the American label, Roc Nation, and told them about her. Ora signed a recording deal and a publishing deal with Roc Nation in December 2008, and was one of their first signees. She made a cameo appearance in Jay Z's video for "Young Forever" (2009). After being signed, Ora recorded an album and wanted to release it, but her label advised against it and she started to work on other material for her debut album.

2012–2013: Breakthrough and Ora 

Throughout 2011, Ora released covers and videos about working on her debut album on YouTube. The videos caught the attention of DJ Fresh, who at that time was looking for a female vocalist for his song, "Hot Right Now". Ora featured on the single that was released on 12 February 2012, debuting at number one on the UK Singles Chart. During February 2012, Ora was also the opening act at the UK concerts from Drake's Club Paradise Tour.

The first UK single from her debut album, "R.I.P." (featuring Tinie Tempah), was released on 6 May 2012. Produced by Chase & Status, the song debuted at the top of the UK Singles Chart, becoming her first solo UK number one. On 12 August, "How We Do (Party)" was released as a single, and it reached number one in the UK and Ireland. It was Ora's second UK number one as a solo artist, and third overall in 2012.

Whilst supporting Coldplay on their Mylo Xyloto Tour, she later announced that her debut album would be titled Ora. The album was released on 27 August 2012 in Europe and Oceania, and debuted at the top of the UK Albums Chart. Ora was nominated for Best New Artist, Push Artist and Best UK/Ireland Act at the 2012 MTV Europe Music Awards. In September 2012, it was announced that Ora would be the opening act on the UK concerts from Usher's Euphoria Tour set to start in January 2013. However, the tour was postponed due to Usher's "professional and personal commitments."

"Shine Ya Light", released on 4 November, became Ora's fourth consecutive UK top ten single in 2012, peaking at number ten. On 28 November 2012, Ora performed as a special guest at the concert held in Tirana, Albania for the 100th Anniversary of the Independence of Albania. In January 2013, Ora embarked on her first UK tour, Radioactive Tour, to support her debut album. She was nominated for three awards at the 2013 Brit Awards, including the Brit Award for British Breakthrough Act.

In January 2013, Ora revealed that her second album would be clearer and have more direction than the first one. On 26 February 2013, she revealed to Digital Spy that her second album shows a different angle to a "party girl." On 24 May 2013, Ora was the headline act on In New Music We Trust stage at BBC Radio 1's Big Weekend. On 28 June 2013, she performed on the Pyramid Stage at Glastonbury.

2014–2016: Split from Roc Nation and other projects 

In 2014, she had two top-five UK singles; the song "I Will Never Let You Down" which debuted at number one, and she featured on Iggy Azalea's "Black Widow" which peaked at number four in the UK, and the latter became Ora's first top ten song on the US Billboard Hot 100 chart, peaking at number three. On 14 December 2014, Ora performed at the 2014 telecast of Christmas in Washington, filmed at the National Building Museum. In February 2015, Ora featured on Charli XCX song, "Doing It", which debuted at number eight in the UK. On 22 February 2015, at the 87th Academy Awards, she performed the song "Grateful", which appears in Gina Prince-Bythewood's film, Beyond the Lights (2014).

In December 2015, Ora filed a lawsuit against Roc Nation, seeking release from the label and citing that the contract she signed in 2008 is "unenforceable", due to California's "seven-year rule." The complaint stated that she's "only been permitted to release one album despite creating multiple additional records for release" and that her relationship with Roc Nation is "irrevocably damaged." In January 2016, Roc Nation filed a counter-lawsuit against Ora for breaking her recording contract, in New York. They reached a settlement in May 2016.

In June 2016, it was reported that she signed a new record deal with Atlantic Records. On 3 September 2016, she performed in a concert at the Basilica of St. Paul Outside the Walls, in Rome, at the vigil for Mother Teresa's canonisation, alongside other Albanian artists, accompanied by the Kosovo Philharmonic Orchestra.

2017–2019: Phoenix 

On 26 May 2017, Ora released her first solo single in almost two years, titled "Your Song", which peaked at number seven in the UK. The song served as the lead single from Ora's second studio album, after previous attempts at her second record were lost in her lawsuit against her former label, Roc Nation. The second single, "Anywhere", became her eleventh top ten song in the UK, peaking at number two. In January 2018,  Ora released the song "For You" (with Liam Payne), from the soundtrack of the film Fifty Shades Freed.

On 18 September 2018, Ora revealed the title of her second studio album, Phoenix, and its release date, 23 November. On 21 September, she released the album's fourth single, "Let You Love Me". The song reached number four in the UK, marking Ora's 13th top-ten song, thus breaking a 30-year-old record for most top ten songs by a British female solo artist (previously jointly held by Shirley Bassey and Petula Clark). On 29 October, she announced tour dates for the album in Europe, Asia and Oceania from 1 March until 29 May 2019.

2019–present: Upcoming third album 

In April 2019, Ora released the song "Carry On" with Norwegian producer Kygo, as a standalone single for Pokémon: Detective Pikachu, a film in which she also briefly appears. On 31 May, she released the song "Ritual", with Tiësto and Jonas Blue. 

In September 2019, Ora confirmed to Marie Claire that she had begun working on her third studio album. She provided further details regarding her upcoming third studio album with NME, stating that "people have been coming to studio sessions from all over the world. I've been working on this now for the past two years, on and off. I have plans for this third album to be something I've never done before." On 12 February 2021, Ora released the extended play, Bang, with Kazakh producer Imanbek. 

In February 2022, Ora she signed a record deal with Berlin-based music label, BMG.

Other ventures

Acting
An appearance in an episode of the British drama series, The Brief, was her first television role, at age 13. Shortly after, she appeared in the British film, Spivs (2004). In April 2014, Ora appeared alongside Korean popstar, Hyuna, in an episode of Funny or Die called "Girl, You Better Walk." In 2015, she played Christian Grey's sister, Mia, in the film adaptation of the best-selling novel Fifty Shades of Grey, a role she later reprised in the film's two sequels. Ora originally approached the production hoping to contribute to the film's soundtrack and instead was asked to audition for the role of Mia Grey by the director of the film, Sam Taylor-Johnson. In the 2021 film, Twist, an adaptation of Charles Dickens' Oliver Twist, Ora played the Artful Dodger.

In February 2022, she was announced to act in the Disney+ prequel  an eight-episode limited series  to the 2017 film, Beauty and The Beast, in a role described as a "fugitive with surprising abilities who carries with her a secret that could potentially affect an entire kingdom", but the project has been put on hold indefinitely.

Endorsements
In 2010, Ora featured in a commercial for Skullcandy headphones. In 2011, she appeared in Calvin Klein's CK One campaign. In 2013, she was the face of Italian sneaker brand, Superga, and the face of "Material Girl", a clothing line designed by Madonna. In September 2013, cosmetics brand, Rimmel, announced their collaboration with Ora for makeup collections. She was the face of two Donna Karan 2014 collections, Resort collection and Autumn/Winter collection. She was also the face of the label's fragrance, DKNY My NY, inspired by New York City. In March 2014, Ora was one of the cast members of Marks & Spencer's "Leading Ladies" campaign. Later in 2014, she appeared as the face of Roberto Cavalli Autumn/Winter campaign. In 2015, she appeared in Coca-Cola and Samsung Galaxy S6 advertising campaigns. In 2019, she was the face of several German brands; luxury fashion label, Escada, jewellery company, Thomas Sabo, and footwear retailer, Deichmann.

Design
In January 2014, Adidas announced a multi-year designer collaboration with Ora for their brand of casual sports clothing, Adidas Originals. Ora designed her own apparel collections for the brand, including footwear and accessories. In 2016, she collaborated with Italian fashion brand, Tezenis, on a capsule lingerie collection. In 2018, Ora co-designed a capsule shoe collection with the Italian footwear designer, Giuseppe Zanotti. After appearing as the face of Escada, Ora co-designed a capsule collection with the brand in 2019.

Television

In 2015, she was a coach on the fourth series of The Voice UK on BBC One, replacing Kylie Minogue. The same year, it was confirmed that Ora and BBC Radio 1 presenter, Nick Grimshaw, signed as judges for the twelfth series of The X Factor on the rival TV network, ITV, after a bidding war between The X Factor and The Voice UK. She hosted the BBC Radio 1's Teen Awards, alongside Grimshaw, several times (from 2013 to 2017).

In July 2016, Tyra Banks, the creator of America's Next Top Model, announced that Ora would replace her as host of the revamped show which aired on VH1. Ora hosted the 2017 MTV Europe Music Awards on 12 November in London, at Wembley Arena. In September 2019, Ora was announced as a judge for the UK version of the music game show, The Masked Singer, which aired on ITV in January 2020. Ora co-hosted the 2022 MTV Europe Music Awards with Taika Waititi, on 13 November in Düsseldorf, Germany.

Philanthropy
On 23 March 2013, Ora performed at Bal de la Rose du Rocher in Monte Carlo in aid of the Princess Grace Foundation. On 1 June 2013, Ora performed at the "Chime for Change" charity concert at Twickenham Stadium, London, which raised funds and awareness for girls' and women's issues around the world.

On 15 November 2014, Ora joined the charity group Band Aid 30 to record a version of the track, "Do They Know It's Christmas?", to raise money for the 2014 Ebola crisis in West Africa. On 9 March 2016, she gave a speech on immigration and the Syrian refugee crisis at the We Day UK event in London, organised by Free the Children.

In April 2019, she became one of UNICEF UK's ambassadors.

Personal life

Ora's mother is Catholic and her father is a nominal Muslim. She considers herself spiritual but not religious.

Her maternal grandfather, Osman Bajraktari, was the Albanian consul to Russia (then part of the Soviet Union). Ora's paternal grandfather, Besim Sahatçiu, was a film and theatre director. She speaks Albanian.

On 10 July 2015, Ora was named an Honorary Ambassador of Kosovo by then-president, Atifete Jahjaga, at the Embassy of Kosovo in London. Ora, who was joined at the ceremony by her parents, and former British Prime Minister and his wife, Tony and Cherie Blair, stated she was "overwhelmed" by the honour.

Ora dated Scottish DJ Calvin Harris from 2013 until June 2014. In 2016, Ora began a relationship with American musician Andrew Watt. They were together for two years until September 2018. They got back together in January 2019, but broke up for the second time in October 2019. Since 2021, she has been in a relationship with New Zealand filmmaker Taika Waititi. They got married in 2022.

In November 2020, Ora broke the COVID-19 restrictions by having her birthday party at a West London restaurant during a period of national lockdown. Ora had recently returned from Egypt and was supposed to be isolating for 14 days as a result. According to the police, Ora's security offered to pay the venue £5,000 to break guidelines and asked for CCTV cameras to be switched off. The restaurant's representative denied that such payment was made. Ora apologised for the breach and was fined £10,000.

Discography

Ora (2012)
Phoenix (2018)
 TBA (2023)

Tours
Headlining
 Ora Tour (2012)
 Radioactive Tour (2013)
 The Girls Tour (2018) 
 Phoenix World Tour (2019)

Supporting
 DJ Fresh – DJ Fresh Tour (2012)
 Drake – Club Paradise Tour (2012)
 Coldplay – Mylo Xyloto Tour (2012)

Filmography

Film

Television

Awards and nominations

References

External links

 
 
 

 
1990 births
Living people
Musicians from Pristina
Kosovo Albanians
People from Notting Hill
Singers from London
21st-century English women singers
21st-century English singers
English women singer-songwriters
English women pop singers
English feminists
English mezzo-sopranos
English women in electronic music
Actresses from London
Alumni of the Sylvia Young Theatre School
21st-century English actresses
English people of Kosovan descent
English people of Albanian descent
Feminist musicians
Naturalised citizens of the United Kingdom
Yugoslav emigrants to the United Kingdom